Franklin Landers–Black and Adams Farm (named for original owner Franklin Landers and later owners Black and Adams), also known as Mt. Aetna Stock Farm, is a historic home and dairy farm located in Brooklyn and Clay Township, Morgan County, Indiana.  The farmhouse was built in 1862, and is a two-story, rectangular, Italianate style brick dwelling with a rear ell.  It has a cross-gable roof, wraparound porch, and features projecting eaves with decorative brackets. Also on the property are the contributing dairy barn (1907–1908), two garages, calf barn, ice house, and acetylene pit.

It was listed on the National Register of Historic Places in 2000.

References

Farms on the National Register of Historic Places in Indiana
Italianate architecture in Indiana
Houses completed in 1862
Houses in Morgan County, Indiana
National Register of Historic Places in Morgan County, Indiana